Antonio Garcia Lopez may refer to:  

Antonio García López (criminal), Puerto Rican criminal
Antonio García López (artist), Spanish Realist painter